Scopaeocharax is a genus of characins endemic to Peru, where both species are found in the upper and middle Huallaga River basin.

Species
There are currently 2 recognized species in this genus:
 Scopaeocharax atopodus (J. E. Böhlke, 1958)
 Scopaeocharax rhinodus (J. E. Böhlke, 1958)

References

Characidae
Fish of South America
Fish of Peru